Alois Windisch (3 February 1892 – 28 December 1958) was an Austrian general in the armed forces of Nazi Germany during World War II.  Along with Friedrich Franek, he was one of only two recipients of both the Knight's Cross of the Iron Cross and the Knight's Cross of the Military Order of Maria Theresa, the highest military honour of Austria-Hungary.

Career

As a young officer in the Austro-Hungarian Army, Windisch served in World War I. Among other decorations, he was awarded the Knight's Cross of the Order of Maria Theresa (11 December 1925). 

A first lieutenant in 1918, he remained in the Army of the newly founded Austrian Republic. Promoted to captain in 1921 (1 January 1921), he was selected for General Staff Training and graduated on top of his class. A full colonel in the Austrian General Staff since 1936 (promotion 24 June 1936) and senior tactics teacher, Windisch was well known for his refusal of the Nazi movement. 

After the Nazi take over in Austria (13 March 1938),  he was considered "politically unreliable", expelled from the General Staff Corps, put on administrative leave and earmarked for forced retirement. The beginning of World War II (1 September 1939) and the resulting need for experienced military leaders led to his assignment as commanding officer of a Mountain Infantry Regiment (Gebirgsjäger-Regiment 139). After the fall of Poland, he and his regiment took part in Operation Weserübung, the invasion of Norway. 

Following the campaign, he was awarded the Knight's Cross of the Iron Cross.

Alois Windisch surrendered to the Soviet troops in 1945 and was extradited to Yugoslavia.  He was sentenced to 20 years imprisonment but was released in 1953.

Awards and decorations

 Knight's Cross of the Iron Cross on 20 June 1940 as Oberst and commander of Gebirgsjäger-Regiment 139

References

 

1892 births
1958 deaths
Major generals of the German Army (Wehrmacht)
Austro-Hungarian military personnel of World War I
Austrian military personnel of World War II
People from Lower Austria
Recipients of the Knight's Cross of the Iron Cross
Recipients of the Order of the Cross of Liberty, 2nd Class
Recipients of the Order of the Crown of King Zvonimir
Knights Cross of the Military Order of Maria Theresa
Austrian prisoners of war
World War II prisoners of war held by the Soviet Union
Austrian people imprisoned abroad
People extradited to Yugoslavia
Austrian Nazis convicted of war crimes
Theresian Military Academy alumni